The PROSE Awards (Professional and Scholarly Excellence) are presented by the Association of American Publishers’ (AAP) Professional and Scholarly Publishing (PSP) Division.

Presented since 1976, the awards annually recognize distinguished professional and scholarly books, reference works, journals, and electronic content. The awards are judged by peer publishers, academics, librarians, and medical professionals. Publishers and authors are honored at a luncheon ceremony at the PSP Annual Conference in Washington, DC.

In recent years, the PROSE Awards luncheon has featured a live webcast of the event, original short films and several multimedia presentations highlighting winners.
 
Awards by the numbers:

 Five “best of” awards chosen from 53 book, reference, journal and e-product categories;
 Forty-five book subject categories for traditional print, electronic publications and print/electronic packages; and
 Six awards for electronic products, including electronic platforms and e-products with multiple components.

Categories 
Book subject categories:
Humanities
Archeology and Ancient History
Art Exhibitions
Art History and Criticism
Biography and Autobiography
Classics
European and World History
Language and Linguistics
Literature
Media and Cultural Studies
Music and the Performing Arts
Outstanding Scholarly Work by a Trade Publisher
Philosophy
Textbook/Humanities
Theology and Religious Studies
U.S. History
Biological and Life Sciences
Biological Sciences
Biomedicine and Neuroscience
Clinical Medicine
Nursing and Allied Health Sciences
Textbook/Biological and Life Sciences
Social Sciences
Anthropology
Architecture and Urban Planning
Business, Finance and Management
Economics
Education Practice
Education Theory
Government and Politics
Law and Legal Studies
Psychology
Sociology and Social Work
Textbook/Social Sciences
Physical Sciences & Mathematics
Chemistry and Physics
Computing and Information Sciences
Cosmology and Astronomy
Earth Science
Engineering and Technology
Environmental Science
History of Science, Medicine and Technology
Mathematics
Popular Science and Popular Mathematics
Textbook/Physical Sciences and Mathematics
Reference Works
Multivolume Reference/Humanities and Social Sciences
Multivolume Reference/Science
Single Volume Reference/ Humanities and Social Sciences
Single Volume Reference/Science

Electronic publication categories – For electronic products, including electronic platforms and e-products with multiple components. Electronic platforms and products are recognized in the following six categories:
Best in Biological and Life Sciences
Best in Humanities
Best Multidiscipline Platform
Best in Physical Sciences and Mathematics
Best in Social Sciences
Innovation in ePublishing (Discretionary)

Journals categories – For print and electronic journals.
 Best New Journal in Science, Technology and Medicine
 Best New Journal in Social Sciences and Humanities

The PROSE Awards for Excellence – Chosen from among the winners of the books, eproducts and journals categories. One winner is recognized in each of the following categories:
Award for Excellence in Biology and Life Sciences
Award for Excellence in Humanities
Award for Excellence in Physical Sciences and Mathematics
Award for Excellence in Reference Works
Award for Excellence in Social Sciences

The R.R. Hawkins Award 
The R. R. Hawkins Award has been presented to the most outstanding work among each year’s PROSE Awards entries since they began in 1976.

Other awards

Notes

References 
https://web.archive.org/web/20120522171950/http://publishers.org/press/57/
http://lj.libraryjournal.com/2012/02/industry-news/2011-prose-awards-presented/
http://www.reedelsevier.com/mediacentre/pressreleases/2012/Pages/elsevier-honored-with-six-prose-awards.aspx
https://web.archive.org/web/20120301004428/http://www.aacr.org/home/public--media/aacr-in-the-news.aspx?d=2685
http://www.prnewswire.com/news-releases/accesspediatrics-wins-a-2011-prose-award-for-best-online-resource-in-biological-and-life-sciences-139511688.html
http://lucian.uchicago.edu/blogs/news/2012/02/14/frederick-de-armas-receives-prose-award/
http://www.ons.org/news.aspx?id=199

Academic publishing
Awards for scholarly publications